Pierre Barrière (died August 31, 1593) was a would-be assassin of King Henry IV of France.

Barrière attempted an assassination of Henry IV on 27 August 1593. He was denounced by a Dominican priest to whom he had confessed. He was executed on 31 August 1593 by breaking on the wheel and dismemberment.

References

16th-century births
1593 deaths
1593 crimes
Failed regicides
People executed by breaking wheel
French assassins
Executed French people
People executed for attempted murder
Year of birth unknown
16th-century executions by France